Salpichlaena is a genus containing two species of fern in the family Blechnaceae. Species of the genus are native to Central and South America. These ferns have climbing leaves with a rachis that twines around tree branches and other supports.

Species
Salpichlaena hookeriana (Kuntze) Alston
Salpichlaena volubilis (Kaulf.) J. Sm.

References
Giudice, G.E., et al., 2008, Revision of the genus Salpichlaena J. Sm. (Blechnaeceae, Pteridophyta), Amer. Fern J., 98 (2): 49–60.

Blechnaceae
Fern genera